St Kilda may refer to:

Scotland:
 St Kilda, Scotland, archipelago in the north Atlantic off the west coast of the Scottish mainland 

Australia:
 St Kilda, Queensland, a locality in Bundaberg Region
 St Kilda, South Australia, suburb of Adelaide, Australia
 St Kilda, Victoria, suburb of Melbourne, Australia
 City of St Kilda, former municipality in Melbourne
 Electoral district of St Kilda, a state electoral district abolished in 1992
 St Kilda light rail station, Melbourne
 St Kilda Cricket Club
 St Kilda Football Club, Australian-rules football club established in 1873
 St Kilda Saints (NBL) or Southern Melbourne Saints, Australian National Basketball League team

New Zealand:
 St Kilda, New Zealand, suburb of Dunedin, New Zealand
 St Kilda (New Zealand electorate), former New Zealand Parliamentary electorate

Canada:
 St. Kilda, Alberta, unincorporated community in Warner County, Alberta

Other:
 Lady of St Kilda, a schooner that the Melbourne suburb was named after